Ross Bekkering (born August 19, 1987) is a former Canadian-Dutch professional basketball player. Bekkering played in the Dutch Basketball League. Bekkering is the younger brother of Henry Bekkering, who was a professional basketball player as well.

He played collegiately for Calgary, where he played five years. In 2010, he started his professional career in the Netherlands with ZZ Leiden, winning the Dutch Basketball League in his rookie year. The following year, he signed with Matrixx Magixx. After one year he returned to Leiden, where he won another DBL title in 2013. Afterwards, he played three years with league rival Donar, where he added two more championships. He retired in 2016.

Four years after his retirement, in 2020, Bekkering played 3x3 basketball for the Netherlands national team. He represented the country at the 2020 Olympics in Tokyo.

Professional career
Bekkering started his professional career with Zorg en Zekerheid Leiden in 2010. With Leiden Bekkering won the Dutch championship. The following season Bekkering left for Matrixx Magixx to team up with his older brother Henry Bekkering. After a year with Magixx Bekkering signed again with Leiden, and in his second season he won the championship once again.

On June 10, 2013 Bekkering signed with the GasTerra Flames from Groningen along with Leiden teammate Arvin Slagter. Bekkering won his first NBB Cup with Flames, by beating his former team Leiden 79–71 in the Final. After the DBL regular season Bekkering was selected in the DBL All-Defense Team. He extended his contract with one year in July 2014.

On June 23, 2016, Bekkering announced his retirement at age 28.

3x3 basketball
In 2021, Bekkering joined the Netherlands national 3x3 team. He played at the 2020 Summer Olympics in Tokyo, where the team finished in the fifth place.

Honours

Professionally
4x Dutch Championship  (2011, 2013, 2014, 2016) 
2x NBB Cup (2014,2015)
2x Dutch Supercup  (2011, 2014) 
Individual awards
2x All-DBL Team  (2013, 2016) 
5x All-Star  (2011, 2013, 2014, 2015, 2016) 
2x DBL All-Defense Team (2014, 2016)
DBL rebounding leader  (2015-2016) 
DBL Statistical Player of the Year  (2015-2016) 
Eurobasket.com Player of the Year (2015-2016)

College
Calgary
2x All-Canada West Team  (2009, 2010) 
2x All-Canadian Team  (2009, 2010)

Statistics

DBL

|-
| 2010–11
| style="text-align:left;"| ZZ Leiden
| 48  ||  || 24.1 || .568 || .267 || .693 || 5.5 || 0.9 || 0.6 || 0.6 || 11.1
|-
| 2011–12
| style="text-align:left;"|  Magixx
| 19 ||  ||  26.1 || .520 || .396 || .637 || 6.8 || 1.1 || 0.8 || 0.9 || 11.4
|-
| 2012–13
| style="text-align:left;"| ZZ Leiden
| 46 ||  || 26.2 || .550 || .259 || .580 ||8.3 || 1.2|| 0.6 || 0.7 || 12.0
|-
| 2013–14
| style="text-align:left;"| Donar
| 35 ||  || 22.8 || .622 || .364 || .586 || 5.9 || 1.5 || 1 || 0.4 || 8.8
|-
| 2014–15
| style="text-align:left;"| Donar
| 15 ||  || 25.1 || .622  || .368 || .609 || 6.4 || 2.4 || 1.3 || 0.3 || 11.4
|-
| 2015–16
| style="text-align:left;"| Donar
| 28 ||  || 29.7 || bgcolor=#CFECEC| .607  || .500 || .650 || bgcolor=#CFECEC|10.5 || 2.5 || 1.2 || 1.0 || 13.5
|-
|}

References

1987 births
Living people
Canadian men's basketball players
Centers (basketball)
Donar (basketball club) players
Dutch Basketball League players
Dutch men's basketball players
Matrixx Magixx players
People from Taber, Alberta
Power forwards (basketball)
B.S. Leiden players
Basketball people from Alberta
3x3 basketball players at the 2020 Summer Olympics
Olympic 3x3 basketball players of the Netherlands
Calgary Dinos men's basketball players